The Ellingwood Arete (also  known as Ellingwood Route or Ellingwood Ledges or some combination thereof) is a popular technical climbing route on Crestone Needle in Colorado's Sangre de Cristo Range.  The Ellingwood Ledges Route is recognized in the historic climbing text Fifty Classic Climbs of North America. An "arete" is "a sharp narrow ridge found in rugged mountains".

Albert R. Ellingwood was a pioneering member of the Colorado Mountain Club and the first to climb the Crestones On these climbs including the 1925 ascent of the arete,Ellingwood was partnered with the long lived  Eleanor Davis.

The route is technically difficult, and the site of multiple climbing fatalities.

References

External links 
summitpost.org
mountainproject.com
rockclimbing.com

Climbing routes